The BRM P261, also known as the BRM P61 Mark II, is a Formula One motor racing car, designed and built by the British Racing Motors team in Bourne, Lincolnshire, England. Stewart, Hill and Richard Attwood also used works P261s to compete in the Tasman Series in 1966. The BRMs dominated, with Stewart winning four, Hill two, and Attwood one of the 1966 Tasman Series' eight races. Stewart also won the title. The works-backed Reg Parnell Racing team returned in 1967 with Stewart and Attwood, where Stewart added another two wins to his tally. In terms of races won and total Championship points scored, the P261 was the most successful car in BRM's history.

Design

Chassis

Colin Chapman's monocoque Lotus 25 of  had put the writing on the wall for older spaceframe chassis designs, and most other Formula One constructors hurriedly started work on their own monocoque cars. The BRM P261 was British Racing Motors's first fully monocoque chassis. As its name suggests, with the P261 (or P61 Mark II) designer Tony Rudd simply built upon the P61's structure, rather than introducing a completely new car. To emphasise this continuity, the P261 chassis numeration continues the P61 sequence, with the first P261 chassis being numbered 2612.

BRM had some previous experience of stressed skin construction with the BRM P25, so Rudd was in a good position to be able to exploit the new technology to the full. This previous experience meant that Rudd's use of the monocoque was somewhat different from the pioneering Lotus's frame. Where the 25 had been a channel-section frame with an open top, within which the driver sat, the P261 chassis was a slim tubular-section, into which a hole was cut to allow the driver to gain access. To replace the P61's subframe the side pontoons of the P261 chassis were extended behind the driver's seat, and the engine was mounted between them. Within the pontoons, rubber cells were used to retain fuel. This caused complications early in the P261's life, as BRM's new, high-exhaust version of the P56 V8 engine was not ready for the start of the 1964 season, and holes had to be cut in the pontoons to allow the exhaust pipes of the older, low-exhaust version to pass through them. The centre exhaust engine appeared at the 1964 Italian Grand Prix in Graham Hill's new chassis "2616" and this and "2617", which was Jackie Stewart's regular car in 1965, were the only two P261s which did not have the exhaust slots. These were plated over on the earlier cars which remained in service, but could be opened up if necessary to fit outside exhaust engines, as happened in the 1967 Tasman Championship.

Engine

In comparison to the older engine, the position of the inlet trumpets and exhaust manifolds had been switched, so that the exhausts exited on the upper surface of the engine, within the cylinder vee, and the inlets protruded above the chassis pontoons on either side of the car. Between the chassis pontoons the engine was covered with a removable, curved panel. Completing the engine cowling was a near-circular gearbox and differential cover at the rear, through which the tail pipes of the exhausts protruded. Shifting the inlets to the outer edges of the car allowed the engine to ingest cooler, denser air, boosting the motor's power output. The compact exhaust bundle also allowed a svelte packaging of the engine bay. However, the heat build-up from the confined manifold necessitated cutting a hole in the top of the engine cover. Despite this, the BRM P261's barrel-shaped rear end became one of its most distinctive visual characteristics.

BRM had experimented with a four-valve-per-cylinder version of the engine, but this was abandoned in favour of the tried and trusted, oversquare (68.5 x 50.8 mm), fuel-injected, two-valve, quad-cam configuration. In  the Formula One upper engine size limit was raised from 1.5 to 3.0 litres, and the 1.9-litre Tasman unit was pressed into service for the World Championship as well. It was further uprated to 2.0 litres as the season progressed. For the P261's 1967 trip to the Antipodes the engine capacity was stretched yet further, providing the ultimate  version, which also saw service in a few Formula One races later in the year. In an attempt to keep the P261 competitive into 1968, the fifth chassis was fitted with the new, 3-litre V12 BRM engine, but without success.

Ancillaries
Fully independent double wishbone suspension was employed at all four corners. Another significant change made from the P61 design was to move the suspension shock absorber components outboard at the rear. This switch was initially made to accommodate the extra cam-cover space needed to employ the 32-valve motor, but though that unit was shelved the suspension geometry was retained. At the front, the coil spring and damper units were retained within the monocoque skin, resulting in a clean, aerodynamic profile around the car's nose-cone. Braking was by outboard-mounted, Dunlop disc brakes all round.

A total of six BRM P261 cars were constructed, with both the first and last chassis built being written off during their careers and rebuilt by the factory. All six survive.

Competition history

1964
The BRM P261 made its race debut at the non-Championship Daily Mirror Trophy race, at Snetterton on 14 March 1964.<ref name=GEL>GEL Motorsport...</ref> Only one car was ready at the time, and it was entered for long-serving works driver Graham Hill. The car immediately showed its promise, as Hill took second place in qualifying, beaten only by newly crowned World Champion Jim Clark's Lotus 25. Unfortunately for Hill, in the race itself he retired following an accident on only the seventh lap. The early season shakedown races continued well for the BRM team; Hill set fastest lap at Goodwood on 30 March, and was only prevented from winning when the car's rotor arm dropped off two laps from the end. Hill added a further two second-place finishes, at the Aintree 200 and BRDC International Trophy races, before the first race of the World Championship season.

Despite the rather interim nature of its engine and chassis configuration, on its World Championship debut at the 1964 Monaco Grand Prix the BRM P261 had the best of starts. Although Hill and team-mate Richie Ginther only managed to qualify in third and eighth places, respectively, in the race Hill set fastest lap, and the two P261s finished first and second. It was the first of Hill's five victories on the Côte d'Azure. Hill continued to perform well throughout the first half of the season, and took a string of three back-to-back second places in France, Britain and Germany. Ironically, it was with the introduction of the proper, high-exhaust version of the engine in Italy that the car's reliability began to falter. At Monza Hill qualified on the front row of the grid, but as he sat waiting for the flag to drop his clutch seized open, and his car sat stationary as the rest of the field streamed past him. Hill bounced back to win in the United States, but finished out of the points at the season finale in Mexico following a collision with Bandini. With reasonable results from Ginther, BRM finished the season second in the Constructors' Championship, with Hill also second in the Drivers' Championship.

1965

BRM's new driver signing for the 1965 Formula One season was promising young Scot Jackie Stewart. In his very first race meeting for the team, the 1965 Race of Champions at Brands Hatch, Stewart used his P261 to immediately make his mark, taking second place in the overall aggregate positions after two heats. Stewart took his first outright race win in that year's International Trophy race. Fortunately for BRM, the car's late season lack of reliability had been cured by the time that the 1965 World Championship season began, and of the BRM P261's twenty Grand Prix starts only four did not result in a points-scoring finish. Hill again won in Monaco and the USA, while Stewart eventually took a closely contested Italian Grand Prix, his first ever World Championship race win in only his first Formula One season, wiping out memories of the previous year's humiliation at Monza. Again BRM took second spot in the constructors' standings at the season's end, with Hill and Stewart taking second and third, respectively, in the Drivers' Championship.

1966
Following the end of the 1965 World Championship season, BRM fitted two of their chassis with the enlarged, 1.9-litre version of the V8 engine, and shipped them to Australia and New Zealand to compete in the Tasman Series. Hill and Stewart accompanied them, along with substitute driver Richard Attwood, and immediately set about dominating the championship, despite the P261 giving away over half a litre to the older Climax-engined cars. The lead pair finished first and second at the season's opening race: the New Zealand Grand Prix. With Hill sitting out the remainder of the New Zealand rounds, Attwood proved an able replacement and took one win and a second place from his three race starts. On Hill's return to the team for the Australian rounds he picked up a second race win, and his results were strong enough for him to finish second in the Championship standing, beaten only by team-mate Stewart who had taken four wins from the series' eight-race schedule.

Back in Europe, only Brabham, Ferrari and Cooper had managed to secure a true 3-litre motor for their Formula One vehicles. Others, like BRM, were due to start the 1966 Formula One season with enlarged versions of their older engines. BRM did have the ambitious H16 engine in development, but for the first few races the team were forced to use the, by now two-year-old, P261. Despite this hindrance Jackie Stewart took first place at the season opening Monaco Grand Prix. However, when Jack Brabham's Brabham BT19 was on song, Hill and Stewart's P261s were outclassed, and were replaced by the H16-engined P83 for the season's final three races. Team Chamaco Collect entered American Bob Bondurant in five races, and British-born South African Vic Wilson in one.  Wilson was the cousin of team boss Bernard White, who subsequently renamed his team to the less-exotic Bernard White Racing and entered a privateer P261 for Innes Ireland in the final two races of 1966, but he failed to finish on either occasion.

1967–1969

Rather than sending the full works team down under for the 1967 Tasman Series season, BRM chose to lend their support to the private Reg Parnell Racing team. The Parnell team prepared two P261s, for works driver Stewart and previous year's race winner Richard Attwood. With the 2.1-litre V8 engine fitted, Stewart again made certain of a BRM victory in the season opening New Zealand GP. Despite scoring four straight podium finishes, Attwood was replaced by Piers Courage and Chris Irwin for the Australian rounds. Although Courage failed to make a mark, Irwin finished the season by taking third place in Longford. Stewart finished equal second in the series standings, but with fewer than half the points of Championship-winner Jim Clark.

Parnell continued to run a 2.1-litre P261 for Chris Irwin and Piers Courage during the subsequent 1967 Formula One season, and Bernard White ran another for David Hobbs at the British and Canadian Grands Prix. However, with the P83 now the main works car, the Bourne works team only fielded a P261 twice in the World Championship, although Stewart did manage third place at the 1967 French Grand Prix in his.

Pedro Rodríguez took a P261 back to the Tasman Series for one final time in the 1968 season, and he took second place at the Longford round. But with the widespread availability of the Cosworth DFV 3-litre V8 in the 1968 Formula One season there was little reason for running with an outclassed and underpowered old chassis in Europe beyond the end of 1967. Nevertheless, chassis number 2615 was fitted with the new BRM V12 engine, the H16's replacement, for a few non-Championship race entries. Its best result was third place in the Grand Prix de Madrid, although it was only the second race that the car managed to finish all year. Australian driver Frank Gardner attempted to qualify the V12 engined car for the 1968 Italian Grand Prix, but his time was too slow. Ian Mitchell's privateer P261 did appear in the British Formula 5000 Guards Trophy races in 1969, but he failed to finish a single race. Tony Dean drove a P261 in the 1969 Madrid Grand Prix at Jarama. Contemporary reports show that he finished second but only completed 39 out of 40 laps. Peter Gethin broke down on lap 40 and some later reports classify him as second.

World Championship results
(key) (results in bold indicate pole position) 

 This total includes points scored by BRM P83 cars

Non-championship results
(key) (results in bold indicate pole position; results in italics indicate fastest lap)

References

Sources
Phipps, D. 1966. Autocourse: The Review of International Motor Sport 1966. Haymarket Press.Prototype Parade No. 185: B.R.M. 1965 F/1 High Exhaust V-8. Model Cars. 2/6 (June 1965), p. 254-255

 (World Championship statistics.)
 (Tasman Series results.)
 (Other race results.)

Footnotes

External links

Video of a P261 being fired up and fettled in the paddock. YouTube.
Photos and brief chassis details. The British Racing Motors (unofficial) Information Page''.
P261 Simulation A detailed, driveable recreation of the BRM P261 1.5-litre F1 version was made available in 2004 as part of the freely available 1965 Mod for the Grand Prix Legends pc racing simulation. An updated 1966 version with 2-litre engine and matching physics was released as part of the '66 Mod' in 2007. 

BRM Formula One cars
Tasman Series cars